Antypas (real name: Antypas Masloumidis, ; born 6 March 1954) is a Greek laïko singer. He released around 20 full-length albums, mostly on Minos.

A couple of his songs were covered by a Serbian singer Aca Lukas, most notably "Gia ta lefta ta kaneis ola" ("Pesma od bola" in Lukas' version), which became a huge hit.

Discography
1982 – Apelpismena S'Agapo
1985 – Poleitai Kai To Spiti Mou
1986 – Apagoreuetai Na' S'Agapo
1986 – Eisai Gynaika Filou
1988 – Tha Ntytho Gabros
1989 – Eroteuomai
1989 – Odigo Kai Se Skeftomai
1990 – Oi Megalyteres Epityhies Tou
1991 – Kalispera
1991 – Timi Mou
1992 – Gia Na Min Trelatho
1994 – Kala Pou Irthes
1995 – Ennoeitai
1997 – I Kalyteri Mou Fasi
1997 – Kataigida
1998 – Oi Nyhtes Tou Trelou
1999 – Hazeuo
2000 – Kai Pali Kalispera
2001 – Antypas 2001
2003 – Me Kommeni Tin Anasa
2005 – Opala
2006 – Ena Klik Ki Ola Allazoun
2006 – Tou Horismou I Ora
2007 – Doro Tin Kardia Mou

Digital single
2012 – Prepei Na Timorithei
2012 – Ores Ores
2013 – Ekei Pou Eisai Imoun
2013 – To Erotima Einai
2013 – Fotia
2014 – Trauma Diamberes
2014 – Valte Kati Na Pio
2014 – Mou Aresei
2015 – Den To Kana
2016 – Ena Agkathino Stefani
2016 – To Methisi
2017 – Tha Kaneis Maura Matia
2017 – Ellinika Milao
2020 – Gia Na Pairneis Tetoia Ora
2022 – Min Akous Kanena

References

1954 births
Living people
20th-century Greek male singers
21st-century Greek male singers
People from Thessaloniki (regional unit)